Pop Castle is a historic plantation house located near White Stone, Lancaster County, Virginia.  It was built in 1855, and is a two-story, five-bay, gable roofed frame dwelling with Greek Revival style details. It has a single pile, central passage plan and two exterior end chimneys. It rests partly on the foundations of an 18th-century dwelling. Also on the property are the contributing antebellum granary and a roughly contemporary smokehouse.  The property also includes the archaeological remains of most related service structures.

It was listed on the National Register of Historic Places in 1989.

References

Plantation houses in Virginia
Houses on the National Register of Historic Places in Virginia
Greek Revival houses in Virginia
Houses completed in 1855
Houses in Lancaster County, Virginia
National Register of Historic Places in Lancaster County, Virginia
1855 establishments in Virginia